Fat Man Press was set up by John McShane of the Glasgow comic shop, AKA Books and Comics in 1989.
Its only title was the four-issue limited series, The Bogie Man, written by John Wagner & Alan Grant, with art by Robin Smith.

Comic book publishing companies of the United Kingdom
1989 establishments in the United Kingdom
Publishing companies established in 1989